Giuseppe Saladino (1556 – 22 November 1611) was a Roman Catholic prelate who served as Bishop of Siracusa (1604–1611).

Biography
Giuseppe Saladino was born in Palermo, Italy in 1556. On 31 May 1604, he was appointed during the papacy of Pope Clement VIII as Bishop of Siracusa. On 7 June 1604, he was consecrated bishop by Camillo Borghese, Cardinal-Priest of San Crisogono, with Agostino Quinzio, Bishop of Korčula, and Leonard Abel, Titular Bishop of Sidon, serving as co-consecrators. He served as Bishop of Siracusa until his death on 22 November 1611.

References

External links and additional sources
 (for Chronology of Bishops) 
 (for Chronology of Bishops)  

16th-century Italian Roman Catholic bishops
17th-century Italian Roman Catholic bishops
Bishops appointed by Pope Clement VIII
1556 births
1611 deaths